Zosin  is a village in the administrative district of Gmina Horodło, within Hrubieszów County, Lublin Voivodeship, in eastern Poland, close to the border with Ukraine.

The meander of the River Bug near Zosin is the easternmost point of Poland (24° 8′ 42.44″ E). 

The village has a population of 70.

A border crossing into Ukraine is located here. Across the border is the village of Ustilug.

References

Poland–Ukraine border crossings
Villages in Hrubieszów County